A Respectable Man is a 1999 Italian drama film written and directed by Maurizio Zaccaro. It depicts the judicial case of television presenter Enzo Tortora, who was falsely accused by several pentiti to be a camorra man and who died of cancer a short time after being acquitted. For his performance Leo Gullotta won the David di Donatello for best supporting actor.

Cast 

Michele Placido: Enzo Tortora
Stefano Accorsi: Lawyer Raffaele Della Valle
Giovanna Mezzogiorno: Silvia Tortora
Mariangela Melato: Anna Tortora
Leo Gullotta: Giovanni Pandico
Luigi Diberti: Public Prosecutor
Pino Ammendola: Lawyer Antonio Coppola
Giuliano Gemma: Lawyer Alberto Dall'Ora
Vincenzo Peluso: Gianni Melluso
Mariano Rigillo: Judge Antonio Fontana

References

External links

1999 films
Italian drama films
1999 drama films
Films directed by Maurizio Zaccaro
Films about miscarriage of justice
Films scored by Pino Donaggio
Italian films based on actual events
1990s Italian films